The Houston Outlaws were a professional American football team that played during the 1999 season as part of the Regional Football League. They played their home games at Pasadena Memorial Stadium in Pasadena, Texas, a suburb of Houston.

The team was announced as one of the league's charter members on November 12, 1998. Although Pro Football Hall of Fame inductee Ernie Stautner was named head coach in February 1999, there is no record of him acting in that capacity. For the team's lone season, former NFL defensive tackle Ray Woodard served as head coach. Josh LaRocca, who had played college football for the Rice Owls, was the starting quarterback.

Although the team was scheduled to play a 12-game regular season, poor attendance and sagging revenues would prove too much for the new league. In the shortened regular season, the Outlaws had a 6–2 record. In the postseason, the Outlaws were seeded second in the four-team playoff bracket. They defeated the Mississippi Pride in a home game, 27–3, to advance to the championship game against the top-seeded Mobile Admirals.  In RFL Bowl I, played at the Admirals' home field, Ladd–Peebles Stadium, the Outlaws were edged by the Admirals, 14–12. It was the third time the Admirals defeated the Outlaws, who did not lose to any other team. After the season, the team and league ceased operation.

1999 season schedule

 May 1 game played in Mobile due to schedule conflict with Houston's stadium

References

External links
Remember the RFL

Outlaws
Regional Football League teams
American football teams established in 1998
American football teams disestablished in 1999
1998 establishments in Texas
1999 disestablishments in Texas